Mael Corboz (born September 6, 1994) is an American professional soccer player who plays as a midfielder for SC Verl.

Early life
Born to French-born parents, Michel and Christine, Corboz has a dual citizenship with France. Corboz's father is a former semi-professional player in Grenoble, and his sisters, Daphne and Rachel play professional soccer in the French women's football (soccer) league.

Raised in Green Brook Township, New Jersey, Corboz played prep soccer at the Pingry School in Basking Ridge, New Jersey and was a member of the New York Red Bulls Academy. After starting his collegiate career at Rutgers University, where he captained the team his sophomore season, Corboz transferred to the University of Maryland at the start of his junior year.

Professional career

New York Red Bulls
On December 23, 2015, Corboz signed a Homegrown Contract with the New York Red Bulls. He joins former Red Bulls academy players Brandon Allen, Alex Muyl, Chris Thorsheim, Scott Thomsen and New York Red Bulls II players, Derrick Etienne and Tyler Adams as the seventh homegrown player signing this season. However, Corboz was waived prior to the season.

Wilmington Hammerheads
Corboz signed with United Soccer League side and New York City FC affiliate club, Wilmington Hammerheads FC on March 18. Two weeks later, Corboz made his professional debut with the club in their season opener against Orlando City B where he assisted on the opening goal of the match.

MSV Duisburg
He moved to MSV Duisburg on August 31, 2016. He made his debut for the club in a Lower Rhine Cup match against PSV Solingen on September 2, 2016. However, he made zero league appearances across one and a half seasons.

Wattenscheid 09
On January 31, 2018, he signed with Wattenscheid 09.

Go Ahead Eagles
Since July 2019, Corboz is under contract with Go Ahead Eagles in the Eerste Divisie, the Dutch second-tier.

SC Verl
Corboz moved to 3. Liga club SC Verl in January 2021, having agreed a contract until summer 2023. He made his debut on January 12, 2021 in a 4–3 win against SpVgg Unterhaching. He scored his first goal for SC Verl on March 10, 2021 in a 2–1 win against Bayern Munich II.

Career statistics

References

External links

1994 births
Living people
American soccer players
French footballers
American people of French descent
Association football midfielders
People from Green Brook Township, New Jersey
Pingry School alumni
Sportspeople from Mobile, Alabama
Sportspeople from Somerset County, New Jersey
Soccer players from Alabama
Soccer players from New Jersey
Eerste Divisie players
USL Championship players
Rutgers Scarlet Knights men's soccer players
Maryland Terrapins men's soccer players
Wilmington Hammerheads FC players
New York Red Bulls players
MSV Duisburg players
SG Wattenscheid 09 players
Go Ahead Eagles players
SC Verl players
American expatriate soccer players in Germany
Homegrown Players (MLS)
American expatriate soccer players
American expatriate sportspeople in the Netherlands
Expatriate footballers in the Netherlands
3. Liga players